The following is a complete list of the filmography of Indian actor Satish Kaushik.

Films

Directing credits

Acting credits

||<?"?
........
...
boobis
?7p=====
credits===

Web series

Acting credits

References

Indian filmographies
Male actor filmographies